Arrigo is an Italian given name.  Derived from the latin form Arrigus, already used in Tuscany in the XI century, it was widely diffused during the Middle ages.

Given name
 Arrigo Barnabé (born 1951), Brazilian actor
 Arrigo Boito (1842–1918), Italian librettist and composer
 Arrigo Boldrini (1915–2008), Italian politician and partisan
 Arrigo Fiammingo (c. 1530 – 28 September 1597), Flemish painter called Hendrick van den Broeck
 Arrigo Sacchi (born 1946), former Italian football manager
 Arrigo Solmi (1873–1944), Italian scholar and politician

Fictional characters
 Arrigo, a fictional character in the opera I vespri siciliani by Giuseppe Verdi

Italian masculine given names